Carlo Tivaroni (1843 – 1906) was an Italian historian and politician. He was born in Zara (Croatian: Zadar), which at the time still had a significant Italian component and was part of Austria-Hungary. He was the brother of Senator Enrico Tivaroni. He has been credited as the first historian of the Risorgimento.

Sources
 M. Rosi: Dizionario del Risorgimento nazionale, IV, Milano 1937
 
 P. De Marchi: ll Veneto tra Risorgimento e unificazione. Partecipazione volontaria (1848-1866) e rappresentanza parlamentare: deputati e senatori veneti (1866-1900), Venice 2011
 W. Maturi:  Intepretazioni del Risorgimento, Turin 1962
 A. Galante Garrone: Carlo Tivaroni: come divenne storico del Risorgimento, in Rivista storica italiana, LXXIX (1967), 2, pp. 313-354
 P. Finelli: Mazzini nella storiografia italiana dell’età liberale, in Bollettino della Domus Mazziniana, XXXIX (1993), 2, pp. 135-151

References

1844 births
1906 deaths
People from Zadar
19th-century Italian historians
Italian politicians